Pringle is a borough in Luzerne County, Pennsylvania,  United States. As of the 2020 census, the borough population was eight hundred and ninety-one.

History
Pringle was incorporated as a borough on January 17, 1914; it was named in honor of Thomas Pringle.

Geography

Pringle is located at  (41.276081, -75.899530).

Demographics

At the 2000 census there were nine hundred and ninety-one people, four hundred and thirty-two households, and two hundred eighty families in the borough. 

The population density was 2,130.5 people per square mile (814.1/km2). There were four hundred and fifty-nine housing units at an average density of 986.8 per square mile (377.1/km2). 

The racial makeup of the borough was 99.90% White, and 0.10% from two or more races. Hispanic or Latino of any race were 1.01%.

There were four hundred and thirty-two households; 23.8% had children under the age of eighteen living with them, 46.8% were married couples living together, 13.2% had a female householder with no husband present, and 35.0% were non-families. 32.2% of households were made up of individuals, and 17.1% were one-person households with residents aged sixty-five or older. 

The average household size was 2.29 and the average family size was 2.89.

The age distribution was 19.7% under the age of eighteen, 6.7% from eighteen to twenty-four, 25.9% from twenty-five to forty-four, 26.8% from forty-five to sixty-four, and 20.9% who were aged sixty-five or older. The median age was forty-four years. 

For every one hundred females there were 93.9 males. For every one hundred females aged eighteen and over, there were 91.3 males.

The median household income was $31,793 and the median family income was $43,750. Males had a median income of $26,801 versus $23,500 for females. 

The per capita income for the borough was $19,108. 

Roughly 8.0% of families and 9.2% of the population were below the poverty line, including 14.8% of those under age eighteen and 10.8% of those aged sixty-five or over.

References

External links

Populated places established in 1914
Boroughs in Luzerne County, Pennsylvania
1914 establishments in Pennsylvania